1 Kings 11 is the eleventh chapter of the Books of Kings in the Hebrew Bible or the First Book of Kings in the Old Testament of the Christian Bible. The book is a compilation of various annals recording the acts of the kings of Israel and Judah by a Deuteronomic compiler in the seventh century BCE, with a supplement added in the sixth century BCE. This chapter belongs to the section focusing on the reign of Solomon over the unified kingdom of Judah and Israel (1 Kings 1 to 11). The focus of this chapter is Solomon's decline and death.

Text
This chapter was originally written in the Hebrew language and since the 16th century is divided into 43 verses.

Textual witnesses
Some early manuscripts containing the text of this chapter in Hebrew are of the Masoretic Text tradition, which includes the Codex Cairensis (895), Aleppo Codex (10th century), and Codex Leningradensis (1008).

There is also a translation into Koine Greek known as the Septuagint, made in the last few centuries BCE. Extant ancient manuscripts of the Septuagint version include Codex Vaticanus (B; B; 4th century) and Codex Alexandrinus (A; A; 5th century).

Old Testament references
:

Solomon's wives and their Idolatry (11:1–8)
Solomon marrying many wives might not be considered unethical at that time, especially for diplomatic reasons, but it should be intolerable in light of the Torah (cf. Deuteronomy 17:17), have been intolerable. The passage focuses on religious rather than moral arguments for the foreign wives in a tone similar to post-exilic texts (Ezra 10; Nehemiah 10) viewing them as a temptation threatening loyalty to the God of Israel. Solomon gave his wives something similar to minority rights and religious freedom in modern terms, but he went too far that he committed a grave sin against YHWH, leading to dire consequences.

A Divine Manifestation (11:9–13)
Because Solomon had "turned away from the Lord", thereby he had broken the first commandment, he faced a consequence of losing power, but in recognition of David's merits, the punishment was delayed and his successor would be left with a smaller kingdom.

Verse 13
However, I will not tear away all the kingdom, but I will give one tribe to your son, for the sake of David my servant and for the sake of Jerusalem that I have chosen.
"Give one tribe": that is "the tribe of Judah", which later became the name of the southern kingdom. However, the tribe of Benjamin can also be counted here due to its close union with the tribe of Judah and their shared property of Jerusalem (as well as the Temple), because the city was of the Jebusite, later conquered by David, but all the ground north of the valley of Hinnom was actually in the tribe of Benjamin. The prophet Ahijah used the same form of words (1 Kings 11:32) when speaking to Jeroboam, after expressly tore his new garment into twelve parts and gave ten of them to Jeroboam.

The adversaries of Solomon (11:14–40)

Solomon's disloyalty to God resulted in the emergence of 'adversary' (Hebrew: satan) to his reign, in form of three different persons: Hadad, an Edomite prince (verses 14–22), Rezon the son of Eliada of Damascus (verses 23–25), and Jeroboam ben Nebat (verses 26–40). The passage clearly states that God was the initiator of these adversaries (verses 14, 23, also 29–33). The brief biography of each adversary presented in the passage has similarities with the earlier history of Israel. 

The life of Hadad, the Edomite prince, echoes the history of the migration of Jacob's family to Egypt and the Exodus:

Hadad stated his desire to return to Edom using 'exodus language': "send me out" (based on the same Hebrew verb: {{Strong-number|shalakh"|H|7971}}).

The biography of Rezon the son of Eliada of Damascus (11:23–25) also has a parallel with the history of David, the king of Israel.

Jeroboam ben Nebat, Solomon's third adversary, arose from within northern Israel, tellingly from among the forced laborers in Ephraim. The parallels of his biography with the life of David are as follows:

Ahijah of Shiloh is shown as Jeroboam's supporter in this passage, but he will be Jeroboam's enemy in 1 Kings 14:1-18.

 Death of Solomon (11:41–43)
This is the first use regular concluding formula in the books of Kings.  The Chronicler mentioned 'the Book of the Acts of Solomon' as a source of information, presumably in form of royal annals. 

Verse 42And the time that Solomon reigned in Jerusalem over all Israel was forty years."Forty years": according to Thiele's chronology, the reign of Solomon began when David died between September 972 BCE and September 971 BCE, until Solomon's death between September 931 BCE and April 930 BCE.

See also

Related Bible parts: Deuteronomy 17, 1 Samuel 15, 2 Samuel 7, 2 Samuel 8, 1 Kings 5, 1 Kings 6, 1 Kings 7, 1 Kings 9, 2 Chronicles 2, 2 Chronicles 9, Ezra 10, Nehemiah 10

Notes 

References

Sources

 

 Thiele, Edwin R., The Mysterious Numbers of the Hebrew Kings'', (1st ed.; New York: Macmillan, 1951; 2d ed.; Grand Rapids: Eerdmans, 1965; 3rd ed.; Grand Rapids: Zondervan/Kregel, 1983).

External links
 Jewish translations:
 Melachim I - I Kings - Chapter 11 (Judaica Press). Hebrew text and English translation [with Rashi's commentary] at Chabad.org
 Christian translations:
 Online Bible at GospelHall.org (ESV, KJV, Darby, American Standard Version, Bible in Basic English)
 1 Kings chapter 11. Bible Gateway

11
Solomon